The 2010 Albanian Cup Final was the 58th final of the Albanian Cup. The final was played at the Qemal Stafa Stadium in Tiranë on 9 May 2009. The match was contested by Besa, who beat Shkumbini in their semi-final, and Vllaznia who beat Teuta.

Match

Details

References

Cup
Albanian Cup Finals
Albanian Cup Final, 2010
Albanian Cup Final, 2010